The Siren is a painting by John William Waterhouse. The painting depicts a siren sitting at the edge of a cliff, lyre in hand, staring down at a shipwrecked sailor floating in water, who in turn is staring up at her.

The picture was painted in 1900 and is now part of a private collection. The estimated sales price for the painting in 2003 was one million pounds.

References 

1900 paintings
Musical instruments in art
Paintings by John William Waterhouse
Bathing in art
Sirens (mythology)
Paintings depicting Greek myths